Sir Noah Thomas FRS FRCP  (1720 – 17 May 1792) was a Welsh physician who was physician-in-ordinary to King George III. He was a fellow of the Royal Society and the Royal College of Physicians, and a Gulstonian lecturer.

Thomas  was born in Neath, Glamorganshire, the son of Hophni Thomas, master of a merchant vessel. He was educated in Oakham, Rutland, and St John's College, Cambridge.

Thomas was the occupant, in 1780, of Cannon Hall, Hampstead.

He was knighted in 1775. He died in Bath, Somerset in 1792.

References 

1720 births
1792 deaths
Fellows of the Royal Society
Fellows of the Royal College of Physicians
Alumni of St John's College, Cambridge
Knights Bachelor
People from Neath
18th-century Welsh medical doctors
Physicians-in-Ordinary